Patrick O'Sullivan (born February 1, 1985) is a Canadian-born American former professional ice hockey forward who played in the National Hockey League (NHL) for the Los Angeles Kings, Edmonton Oilers, Carolina Hurricanes, Minnesota Wild and Phoenix Coyotes.

Early life
O'Sullivan was born in Toronto, Ontario, but grew up in Winston-Salem, North Carolina. His father, John O'Sullivan, a Toronto native, played for the minor-league Winston-Salem Thunderbirds of the Atlantic Coast Hockey League.

O'Sullivan has spoken openly about being emotionally and physically abused for years by his father. The abuse continued up to the time he started playing for the Mississauga Ice Dogs of the Ontario Hockey League (OHL). Some notable acts were mainly verbal and physical abuse when Patrick had an off-game. O'Sullivan's father whipped him with a heavy leather jump rope and sometimes an electrical cord. There were also reports of John threatening and intimidating him. O'Sullivan was also sometimes locked out of the house in his pajamas during winter. The abuse escalated at an OHL game where John was screaming, cursing and pounding on the glass. The abuse reached a point where Patrick pressed charges against his father and filed a restraining order against him. O'Sullivan later detailed the abuse in a book, Breaking Away: A Harrowing True Story of Resilience, Courage and Triumph.

Playing career

Amateur
Despite the abuse, O'Sullivan was a junior hockey league star, winning the OHL and Canadian Hockey League (CHL) rookie of the year awards in 2002 and setting records for games, goals, assists and points for the Mississauga/Niagara IceDogs that, as of 2015, were still unbroken.

Professional
O'Sullivan was drafted in the second round, 56th overall, in the 2003 NHL Entry Draft by the Minnesota Wild after having been projected as a top-five talent. He played his first season for their American Hockey League (AHL) affiliate, the Houston Aeros, during the 2005–06 season. He had a strong season, scoring 47 goals and 93 points to break all Houston Aeros' rookie scoring records.

During the 2006 NHL Entry Draft, O'Sullivan was traded (along with their 17th overall pick, eventually used to select Trevor Lewis) to the Los Angeles Kings in exchange for Pavol Demitra.

O'Sullivan began the 2006–07 season with the Kings when he made his NHL debut on October 6, 2006, to become the first person from North Carolina to play in the NHL. He became the second NHL player, behind Jeff Halpern, to have been raised in the American South. O'Sullivan, along with Halpern, Jamie Fritsch, Jared Ross, Blake Geoffrion and Jarred Tinordi, are the only NHL players to date to come from the region. On November 2, 2006, O'Sullivan was assigned to the Kings' AHL affiliate at the time, the Manchester Monarchs. On January 25, 2007, he was recalled to the NHL.

On March 4, 2009, O'Sullivan (along with the Calgary Flames' second-round draft pick) was traded to the Carolina Hurricanes in exchange for Justin Williams, following which he was immediately traded (along with a second-round pick) to the Edmonton Oilers in exchange for Erik Cole and a fifth-round pick. He would play 19 games for the Oilers during the remainder of the season, scoring two goals and four assists.

On June 29, 2010, O'Sullivan (along with Ethan Moreau and Robert Nilsson) was placed on waivers by Edmonton. After clearing waivers the following day, on June 30, he was traded to the Phoenix Coyotes in exchange for Jim Vandermeer. His contract was then immediately bought-out by the Coyotes, resulting in his free agency. On September 17, 2010, O'Sullivan signed a two-way contract with the Carolina Hurricanes to become the first native of North Carolina to play for the Hurricanes. After being a healthy scratch ten times, O'Sullivan was placed on waivers by the Hurricanes and acquired by the Minnesota Wild.

On August 4, 2011, O'Sullivan signed a one-year, two-way contract with Phoenix. Unable to earn a regular position, scoring 4 points in 23 games to begin the 2011–12 season, O'Sullivan was reassigned to the Coyotes' AHL affiliate, the Portland Pirates. On March 2, 2012, the Coyotes loaned O'Sullivan to the Peoria Rivermen of the AHL in exchange for Brett Sterling.

On September 26, 2012, O'Sullivan signed his first European contract, agreeing to a one-year deal with HIFK of the Finnish SM-liiga. He scored one goal in eight games for HIFK before he was released one month into the 2012–13 season.

Records
 Edmonton Oilers franchise record for worst +/- regular season (2009–10) minus 35
 Mississauga IceDogs franchise record for most regular season assists: (2004–05) – 59
 Mississauga IceDogs franchise record for most regular season points:(2001–02) – 92
 Houston Aeros franchise record for most regular season goals by a rookie: (2005–06) – 47
 Houston Aeros franchise single season record for most goals: (2005–06) – 47
 Houston Aeros franchise record for most regular season assists by a rookie: (2005–06) – 46
 Houston Aeros franchise record for most regular season points by a rookie: (2005–06) – 93

Career statistics

Regular season and playoffs

International

Awards and honours

References

External links 

1985 births
American men's ice hockey centers
Canadian emigrants to the United States
Carolina Hurricanes players
Edmonton Oilers players
HIFK (ice hockey) players
Houston Aeros (1994–2013) players
Ice hockey people from North Carolina
Living people
Los Angeles Kings players
Manchester Monarchs (AHL) players
Minnesota Wild draft picks
Minnesota Wild players
Mississauga IceDogs players
Peoria Rivermen (AHL) players
Phoenix Coyotes players
Portland Pirates players
Ice hockey people from Toronto
Sportspeople from Winston-Salem, North Carolina